Greece competed at the 1932 Summer Olympics in Los Angeles, United States. The Greek team participated to the Games, after a fundraising was organised by the Greek American Community to pay for the expenses of the travel. The best results were Gerogios Zervilis' and Ioannis Farmakidis' 5th place, both in Freestyle wrestling.

References

Official Olympic Reports

Nations at the 1932 Summer Olympics
1932
O